Agonopsis chiloensis, the snailfish, is a fish in the family Agonidae. It was described by Leonard Jenyns in 1840. It is a subtropical, marine fish which is known from the southeastern Pacific and southwestern Atlantic Ocean, including Chile, Patagonia, and Argentina. It is known to dwell at a depth range of 3–400 metres. Males can reach a maximum standard length of 12.5 centimetres.

Agonopsis chiloensis is preyed upon by Cottoperca gobio, imperial shag, Pinguipes chilensis, and the narrowmouthed catshark. It is of no commercial interest to fisheries.

References

chiloensis
Taxa named by Leonard Jenyns
Fish described in 1840